Papa Gino's, Inc. is a restaurant chain based in Dedham, Massachusetts, specializing in traditional thin crust pizza along with pasta, subs, salads, and a variety of appetizers. As of 2022, there are 80 Papa Gino's locations in Connecticut, Massachusetts, New Hampshire and Rhode Island.

History 
Papa Gino's originated in East Boston, Massachusetts as a single location named "Piece O' Pizza," which opened in 1961. In 1968, the owners, Helen and Michael Valerio, changed the name to "Papa Gino's" and began expanding the business to multiple locations, 220 when they sold the company to a group of investors in 1991.

In 1997, Papa Gino's bought D'Angelo Sandwich Shops, another Massachusetts-based fast-food outlet, specializing in sandwiches, from prior owner Yum! Brands (then known as PepsiCo Inc.'s Pizza Hut unit). A few months later, executives of a holding company, Papa Gino's Holdings Corporation (later known as PGHC Holdings), bought out the company in a deal financed by Bunker Hill Capital Partners.

2018 bankruptcy
On September 18, 2018, Bunker Hill Capital Partners ended their investment with PGHC Holdings. On November 4, 2018, dozens of Papa Gino's locations closed abruptly, including their only location in Maine, at the Auburn Mall, bringing the chain from over 150 locations to 97. Employees  were not given advance notice of the closures and were told to apply to other restaurants when they arrived for work at closed stores. The following day, PGHC Holdings filed for bankruptcy protection and announced that it had reached an agreement in principle to sell its restaurant chains to Wynnchurch Capital.

In November 2018, the chain's parent company, PGHC Holdings, filed for Chapter 11 bankruptcy protection, which it has since emerged from upon sale to private equity firm, Wynnchurch Capital in 2019.

Post-bankruptcy
On June 14, 2022, it was revealed that Papa Gino’s would be opening a new restaurant for the first time since it emerged from bankruptcy.

Advertising 
Since the late 1990s, the chain has partnered with the Boston Red Sox and New England Patriots, as well as individual players with the teams such as former Red Sox designated hitter David Ortiz. Patriots linebacker Tedy Bruschi replaced kicker Adam Vinatieri as pitchman in the fall of 2006, after Vinatieri was signed by the Indianapolis Colts. In 2020, Papa Gino's continues to partner with the Providence Bruins, the Pawtucket Red Sox and Holy Cross. They also partner with many local kids teams in the communities that they serve.

See also 
 List of pizza chains of the United States

References

External links 
 Official website
 Papa Gino's on LinkedIn
 
 
 
 
 Interview with CEO Tom Sterrett in Boston Business Journal 

Companies based in Massachusetts
Companies based in Dedham, Massachusetts
Restaurants in Massachusetts
New England
Economy of the Northeastern United States
Regional restaurant chains in the United States
Fast-food chains of the United States
Fast-food franchises
Pizza chains of the United States
Restaurants established in 1961
1961 establishments in Massachusetts
Companies that filed for Chapter 11 bankruptcy in 2018